Elizabeth "Liza" Wang Ming-chun SBS (born 28 August 1947), is a Hong Kong diva, actress and MC. She is a personality in Chinese-speaking communities. She has been nicknamed "The Big Sister" in the Hong Kong entertainment circle. Wang was a delegate in the National People's Congress from 1988 to 1997, and she is a member of the Chinese People's Political Consultative Conference.

Entertainment career
Liza Wang was born on 28 August 1947 in Shanghai, She moved to Hong Kong from Shanghai in autumn 1956 and signed up for Rediffusion Hong Kong's first Artist Academy class in 1967. From thousands of applicants, the 20-year-old Liza was one of the nine that were picked to attend acting classes. She was also the first to graduate from the academy.

Television
Her career has spanned four decades, since 1967. She began working for Rediffusion Television Limited (later renamed Asia Television and now defunct) until she joined TVB in 1971. She was one of the members of the all-girl music group Four Golden Flowers. Wang initially made her mark in the entertainment industry in drama series. Her work in front of the camera was followed by that behind the scenes on television productions.

In 2005, she received the Best Actress award during TVB's 38th Anniversary. She received this award the second time for her role in Wars of In-laws. Wang received her first Best Actress award for her drama series The Awakening Story in 2001. She celebrated her 40th anniversary in the entertainment industry in 2007.

Singing career
In parallel with her acting career Wang had a successful singing career, based on albums for her television series, consisting of TV theme songs.  She has sung cantopop as well as mandopop. She performed duets with singer Adam Cheng. She continues to perform TV theme songs such as "東方之珠" for musical series like the 2006 Glittering Days.

Cantonese opera

She experimented with stage musicals before becoming a Cantonese opera actress. It was within the Cantonese opera community that Wang met her longtime partner, Law Kar-ying. In 2005 the Sunbeam Theatre in North Point, Hong Kong's only regular venue for Cantonese Opera performances, was planned to close following a change of ownership. Wang decided to negotiate with the new owner, who then promised to extend the contract with the Cantonese Opera groups. Wang then criticized the Government for its lack of support for Cantonese Opera, and the Government promised to adopt Wang's request.

Wang was Chairman of the Chinese Artist Association of Hong Kong (香港八和會館) from 1992 to 1997, then again from 2005 to 2009. In 2007 Wang was awarded the Montblanc de la Culture Arts Patronage Award. She was later awarded an Honorary Doctorate of Letters by the City University of Hong Kong.

In February 2009 Wang fought for the development rights to restore the North Kowloon Magistracy building (北九龍裁判法院) in Sham Shui Po.<ref name="stan1">The Standard HK. "The Standard.com".  Retrieved on 13 March 2009.</ref> The building was originally proposed to be a new Cantonese opera training and performance center. Hong Kong's government granted the bid to the US Savannah College of Art and Design. Wang was upset over the loss, and said the government was only paying lip service to causes such as Cantonese opera.  The magistracy building is to be turned into a school specializing in creative and digital media."Yahoo". 八和落選 汪明荃轟黑箱作業 Retrieved on 13 March 2009

Political career

Pan-democrat home return permits request
Since the 1997 transfer of sovereignty, the Chinese Communist Party have banned 8 of the 25 Hong Kong pan-democrat legislative councilors. They are barred from the mainland except for tours organized by the government. On 6 March 2008 Wang began publicizing the need to grant 24 Home Return Permit to the pro-democracy lawmakers.The standard HK. "The standard HK ". TV star hopes home visits can turn democrats into patriots Retrieved on 10 March 2008

Government Committee
On Apr 29, 2020, The Hong Kong SAR announced the appointments to the Cantonese Opera Advisory Committee which aims to promote the development of Cantonese opera, facilitating the transmission of this world intangible cultural heritage item, for the period from May 1, 2020, to April 30, 2022.  Wang is one of the members.

2008 Beijing Olympics
Wang mentioned that it was good timing to invite the democrats to enter mainland China in time for the 2008 Beijing Olympics.

The Pro-Beijing party Democratic Alliance for the Betterment of Hong Kong member Tam Yiu Chung responded that the Olympics was not a good reason for changing what the central government used to do.  Her concerns baffled her colleagues in the Chinese People's Political Consultative Conference. Democrat member Albert Ho said the issue of a home visit permit was such a rightful thing. It has never been mentioned by any politician but a performer. He appreciates Wang's efforts. Wang is a member, but not a standing committee member of the CPPCC.

Community work
As a mainstay at the TVB television network, Wang has gained almost legendary status for her efforts not merely as an entertainer but also as a philanthropist with a heart for social works and for improving lives in rural China and other areas. Within Hong Kong, she has also been an MC hosting TVB telethons for Tung Wah Group of Hospitals and many other charities.

Wang, being a two-time cancer survivor (first thyroid then breast cancer), decided to be an executive committee member of the Hong Kong Anti-Cancer Society. A series of informative radio talk shows on RTHK was also hosted where medical specialists were invited to discuss the many types of cancer. She has helped raise charities, awareness and funding for cancer patients. Recently a free concert was given at Tin Shui Wai for 4,500 residents; the concert was filled to capacity and hundreds were turned away. The crowd prevented guest performers like Miriam Yeung and Denise Ho from arriving on time. Denise Ho ascribed the audience overflow to Wang's popularity.

Personal life
Liza Wang was married to businessman Lau Cheong Wah from 1971 to 1983 and they remain good friends. In the late 1980s, she met Law Kar-ying, openly acknowledged as her partner for over twenty years, and whom she married on 2 May 2009 in Las Vegas. Being a native Shanghainese, Wang speaks fluent Shanghainese and has always identified as a Shanghainese.

The nickname of "Wang Ah-Tag" owing to social media usage
In recent years, Liza Wang has increased her usage in social media. However, upon uploading the photos with others, she has been handwriting the names of others on the photos. These handwritings have been occasionally described as "Wang Ah-Tag".

Filmography
 Television series 

 Films 
 1969 Singing Darlings 
 1980 Miss Not Home 
 197i The Sausage Chase 
 1979 Full Moon Scimitar 
 2015 ATM''

Awards

Honors
 Silver Bauhinia Star (2004)
 TVB Best Actress (2001, 2005)
 RTHK Gold Needle Award (2005)
 Mont Blanc de la Culture International Award (2007)

References

External links

Official Liza Wang web-site
Official Liza Wang Forum

 	 

|-
! colspan="3" style="background:#DAA520;" | TVB Anniversary Awards

|-

|-
! colspan="3" style="background:#DAA520;" | RTHK Top 10 Chinese Golden Songs Award

1947 births
Delegates to the 7th National People's Congress
Delegates to the 8th National People's Congress
Hong Kong film actresses
Members of the 10th Chinese People's Political Consultative Conference
Members of the 11th Chinese People's Political Consultative Conference
Members of the 12th Chinese People's Political Consultative Conference
Hong Kong television actresses
Hong Kong television presenters
Hong Kong women television presenters
Living people
People's Republic of China politicians from Shanghai
Singers from Shanghai
TVB veteran actors
Hong Kong Cantonese opera actresses
Members of the Preparatory Committee for the Hong Kong Special Administrative Region
20th-century Hong Kong actresses
21st-century Hong Kong actresses
Members of the Selection Committee of Hong Kong
Members of the Election Committee of Hong Kong, 1998–2000
Members of the Election Committee of Hong Kong, 2000–2005
Members of the Election Committee of Hong Kong, 2007–2012
Members of the Election Committee of Hong Kong, 2012–2017
Members of the Election Committee of Hong Kong, 2017–2021
Members of the Election Committee of Hong Kong, 2021–2026
Actresses from Shanghai
20th-century Hong Kong women singers
21st-century Hong Kong women singers
Recipients of the Silver Bauhinia Star
Chinese film actresses
Chinese television actresses
20th-century Chinese actresses
21st-century Chinese actresses
Hong Kong idols